Dyspteris is a monotypic moth genus in the family Geometridae erected by Jacob Hübner in 1818 found in North America. Its only species, Dyspteris abortivaria, the bad-wing, was first described by Gottlieb August Wilhelm Herrich-Schäffer in 1855. It is called "bad-wing" because its forewing is much larger than its hindwing, making it often difficult to pull into position for spreading.

The MONA or Hodges number for Dyspteris abortivaria is 7648.

References

Further reading

External links

Geometridae genera
Larentiinae
Articles created by Qbugbot
Moths described in 1855
Monotypic moth genera